This article contains the discography of American soul and R&B singer-songwriter, poet, and actress Jill Scott, including studio albums, live albums, compilation albums, DVDs and singles.

Albums

Studio albums

Compilation albums

Remix albums

Live albums

Singles

Promotional singles

As featured artist

Music videos
 "Gettin' in the Way"
 "A Long Walk"
 "The Way"
 "He Loves Me" (Jill's Home Video)
 "Gimme"
 "Golden"
 "Whatever"
 "Cross My Mind"
 "Hate on Me"
 "My Love"
 "Shame"
 "So in Love"
 "Hear My Call"
 "So Gone (What My Mind Says)"
 "Blessed"
 "You Don't Know"
 "Back Together″

References

Discography
Discographies of American artists
Rhythm and blues discographies
Soul music discographies
Hip hop discographies